Ashley Hall is a musician who did the singing voice of Cooler in 1988's Pound Puppies and the Legend of Big Paw. He also composed the scores for Million Dollar Mystery (1987) and Happily Ever After (1993).

External links
 

American male singers
Living people
1959 births